Stafford Earl Mays (born March 13, 1958) is a former American football defensive tackle.

Life and career
Mays was born in Lawrence, Kansas. He went to Lincoln High School in Tacoma, Washington. Mays played junior college football at Mount Hood Community College. He later played college football at the University of Washington.

Mays played in the National Football League as a defensive end and defensive tackle for the St. Louis Cardinals and the Minnesota Vikings between 1980 and 1988. Mays later worked as an executive at Microsoft.

Mays's son, Taylor Mays, was a standout player at O'Dea High School in Seattle and then the University of Southern California. He went on to play safety in both the NFL and CFL.

References

1958 births
Living people
Sportspeople from Lawrence, Kansas
Players of American football from Tacoma, Washington
American football defensive ends
American football defensive tackles
Washington Huskies football players
St. Louis Cardinals (football) players
Minnesota Vikings players
Microsoft employees
Mt. Hood Community College alumni
National Football League replacement players